Edward Allan Frieman (January 19, 1926 – April 11, 2013) was an American physicist who worked on plasma physics and nuclear fusion. He was the director of the Scripps Institution of Oceanography from 1986 through 1996, and then the senior vice president of science and technology at the Science Applications International Corporation from 1996 on until his death in 2013.

Early life and career 
Frieman was born in New York in 1926. During World War II, he served as a deep-sea diving officer and was a participant in the atomic tests at Bikini Atoll. After the war, Columbia University granted him a bachelor's degree in engineering in 1946. He then received his master's and doctorate degrees in physics from the Polytechnic Institute of Brooklyn in 1948 and 1951 respectively.

Frieman spent 25 years at Princeton University, becoming a professor of astrophysical science in 1961. It was during this period of time where he was noted to have advised Charles Kennel on his doctoral thesis.

In 1979, he was nominated by President Jimmy Carter to be the director of Office of Science within the United States Department of Energy. He served in the position from 1980 to 1981.

In 1981, he became an executive vice president of the Science Applications International Corporation, a high-tech company in La Jolla. In 1986, Frieman became the director of the Scripps Institution of Oceanography, a research institution at the University of California, San Diego. Frieman also served on the boards of the American University in Paris and the U.S.-Israel Binational Science Foundation.

Awards and honors 
In 1962, Frieman was elected a fellow of the American Physical Society (APS) and then inducted into the National Academy of Sciences in 1981. He was elected a member of the American Philosophical Society in 1990. In 2002, Frieman was awarded the James Clerk Maxwell Prize for Plasma Physics by APS.

References

External links 

 Oral history interview transcript with Edward Frieman in 25 June 1986, American Institute of Physics, Niels Bohr Library & Archives
 Oral history interview transcript with Edward Frieman in June 2004, American Institute of Physics, Niels Bohr Library & Archives

1926 births
2013 deaths
Plasma physicists
American physicists
Members of JASON (advisory group)
Polytechnic Institute of New York University alumni
Columbia School of Engineering and Applied Science alumni
Members of the United States National Academy of Sciences
United States Department of Energy officials
Carter administration personnel
Members of the American Philosophical Society
Fellows of the American Physical Society